Shootin' for Love is a 1923 American silent Western film directed by Edward Sedgwick and featuring Hoot Gibson. Gibson plays a World War I veteran suffering from shell shock who at his father's ranch becomes involved in a dispute over water rights that leads to gunfire. The British Board of Film Censors, under its then-current guidelines, banned the film in 1923.

Cast
 Hoot Gibson as Duke Travis
 Laura La Plante as Mary Randolph
 Alfred Allen as Jim Travis
 William Welsh as Bill Randolph
 William Steele as Dan Hobson
 Arthur Mackley as Sheriff Bludsoe
 W.T. McCulley as Sandy
 Kansas Moehring as Tex Carson

See also
 Hoot Gibson filmography

References

External links
 
 
 Lobby card at gettyimages.com

1923 films
1923 Western (genre) films
American black-and-white films
Films directed by Edward Sedgwick
Silent American Western (genre) films
Universal Pictures films
1920s American films